Three Uneasy Pieces is a collection of three short stories by Australian writer Patrick White, first published by Pascoe Publishing in 1987. It is the final work of fiction he published in his life.

Contents
 The Screaming Potato
 Dancing with Both Feet on the Ground
 The Age of a Wart

External links
 The Complete Review on Three Uneasy Pieces.

References

Works by Patrick White